The M25 is a metropolitan route in the eThekwini Metropolitan Municipality, South Africa linking the R102 in KwaMashu to Inanda, north-west of Durban. The M25 serves as one of the most important commuter routes in Greater Durban connecting two of its largest townships to Durban (via the R102).

Route 

The M25 also known as the Curnick Ndlovu Highway (previously and popularly known as the KwaMashu Highway) begins a double-carriageway freeway from its interchange with the R102 (to the N2 highway and Durban) and M5 (to New Germany and Mt Edgecombe) in Duffs Road, KwaMashu. It runs in a northwesterly direction bordering between KwaMashu in the south and Phoenix in the north and passes over the M21 Malendela Road interchange. The M25 enters Inanda to pass over the Bhejane Road interchange and the Ntuzuma Road interchange before ending its status as a freeway just after Ntuzuma Road. It proceeds to traverse through Inanda and turns right in a northerly direction at a traffic circle at the far eastern side of Inanda. After the traffic circle, the M25 then becomes Mafukuzela Highway proceeding to traverse through the hills of Inanda before entering leaving the township to enter the far eastern part of Mawothi and ending at an intersection with the M27 Jabu Ngcobo Drive (to Verulam) and Mawezulu Road (to Osindweni).

The Bhejane Road interchange construction resulted in an engineering award for eThekwini Municipality.

References 

Metropolitan Routes in Durban